Diospyros macrophylla is a tree in the family Ebenaceae.  The specific epithet macrophylla means "large-leafed".

Description
The inflorescences bear up to 20 flowers.

Distribution and habitat
Diospyros macrophylla is native to Sumatra, Java, Borneo, Sulawesi and the Philippines. Its habitat is in mixed dipterocarp forests from sea level to  altitude.

References

macrophylla
Plants described in 1826
Trees of Malesia